The Mariner's Church (or Mariners' Church or Mariners Church) may refer to the following congregations or buildings:

United States
 Mariners Church of Irvine, California
 Mariner's Church (Portland, Maine)
 Mariners' Church of Detroit, Michigan
 Mariners' Church of Philadelphia, Pennsylvania, which was absorbed into the Old Pine Street Church in 1965

Other places
 Mariners' Church, The Rocks, in Sydney, Australia
 Mariners' Church, Dún Laoghaire, Co. Dublin, Ireland
 Mariners' Church, Leith, Edinburgh, Scotland, also known as St Ninian's Church, now merged with other congregations to form North Leith Parish Church